Tour Nuggets is the name of a cassette-only release by alternative rock band Cake. It was released exclusively in Canada.

Track listing

"The Distance" - 3:00
"Race Car Ya-Yas" - 1:21
"It's Coming Down" - 3:44
"Nugget" - 3:58

External links
http://www.cakemusic.com/

1995 EPs
Cake (band) albums
Capricorn Records albums